Brickellia baccharidea, the resinleaf brickellbush, is a North American species of shrubs in the family Asteraceae. It is native to the southwestern United States (Arizona, southern New Mexico, and western Texas) and northwestern Mexico (northern Sonora, western Chihuahua).

Brickellia baccharidea is a branching shrub up to 150 cm (60 inches) tall. It produces numerous cream-colored flower heads grouped into tight panicles.

References

External links
photo of herbarium specimen at Missouri Botanical Garden, collected in Arizona

baccharidea
Flora of the Southwestern United States
Flora of Northwestern Mexico
Plants described in 1852